My Name Ijj Lakhannn is an Indian Hindi language sitcom TV show that premiered on 26 January 2019 at SAB TV. It starred Shreyas Talpade, Esha Kansara, Parmeet Sethi, Archana Puran Singh and Ribbhu Mehra.

Plot 
Lakhan is a small goon who does bad deeds, but his good nature brings him on the right path. He loves his parents, and decides to make money by doing work, as his father wanted(whom he thinks is dead). He is envied by his master, Lucky, who wants Lakhan to be ousted, and is jealous of him. As Lakhan keeps on running in comical and tough situations, he figures ways to get out of them and strives to become a good person.

Cast 
 Shreyas Talpade as Lakhan
 Esha Kansara as Radha
 Parmeet Sethi as Dashrath
 Archana Puran Singh as Paramjeet
 Sanjay Narvekar as Lucky Bhai
 Nasirr Khan as Aftab Chunni
 Ribbhu Mehra as Arjun Rathod
 Deeksha Kanwal Sonalkar as Sweety
 Jayesh Thakkar as Jignesh
 Pawan Singh as Ghanti

References

External links 

Sony SAB original programming
2019 Indian television series debuts
Hindi language television sitcoms
2019 Indian television series endings